Aqbolagh-e Bahman (also Romanized as Āqbolāgh-e Bahman; also known as Āq Bolāgh) is a village in Molla Yaqub Rural District, in the Central District of Sarab County, East Azerbaijan Province, Iran. At the 2006 census, its population was 86, in 14 families.

References 

Populated places in Sarab County